Bhambatha may refer to:

Bhambatha, Bambatha kaMancinza (c. 1860–1906?), Zulu chief of the amaZondi clan in the Colony of Natal
Bambatha Rebellion, a Zulu revolt against British rule and taxation in the Colony of Natal, South Africa, in 1906
Bhambatha (album), a 2004 album by Zola
Bambata (music project), a music project in South Africa